Bourassa State Forest is a  state forest located in Bedford County, Virginia, north of Smith Mountain Lake. It is used primarily for timber production, as an outdoor lab, and as a wildlife sanctuary. The forest is adjacent to the Smith Mountain Cooperative Wildlife Management Area.

Bourassa State Forest is owned and maintained by the Virginia Department of Forestry. It is open to the public for horseback riding and hiking; hunting, camping, and motorized vehicles are prohibited. Some uses may require visitors to possess a valid State Forest Use Permit.

See also
 List of Virginia state forests
 List of Virginia state parks

References

External links
Virginia Department of Forestry: Bourassa State Forest

Virginia state forests
Protected areas of Bedford County, Virginia
1986 establishments in Virginia
Protected areas established in 1986